AGF may refer to:

 AGF, stage name of Antye Greie, German vocalist, musician, composer, producer, and new media artist
 AGF (company), a French insurance company
 AGF (light infantry vehicle), an armoured car used by the German army
 AGF (motorcycle), a French motorcycle manufactured 1948–1956
 Aarhus Gymnastikforening, a football club in the city of Århus, Denmark
 A Good Fight, American music band
 American General Finance, a former American financial services company, now part of OneMain Financial
 Asian Games Federation, the former governing body of sports in Asia
 .agf, ISO 639-3 code for the Arguni language, spoken in western New Guinea
 Army Ground Forces, one of three components of the Army of the United States during World War II
 AGF, US Navy code for Auxiliary command ship
 Avanguardia Giovanile Fascista, a former Italian fascist student organization
 AgF, chemical formula of Silver(I) fluoride
 AGF, a Japanese marketing company of coffee and a division of Ajinomoto